Jim Witter (born November 2, 1964) is a Canadian award-winning country music and Christian music singer/songwriter. Ten of Witter's songs reached the top 10 on Canadian country radio.

Biography

Jim Witter grew up playing music. In 1982, he performed four songs on the "Music for Safe Water" compilation by 1280 CHAM radio.  As a teenager, while still in high school, Jim honed his musical talents by playing evenings at a piano bar and restaurant called Snuggles, in Hamilton Ont.  In 1990, one of Witter's demos caught the attention of a Sony Music Canada executive. Within three years, Witter was signed to FRE Records. His debut album, Jim Witter, was released in 1993. The first single, "Everything and More," entered the National Country Chart at No. 40, at the time a first for a debut Canadian single. Every single released from the album reached the top 10 on the Canadian country singles chart, including "Distant Drum," "Stolen Moments," "Sweet Sweet Poison" and "Chevy Coupe." Witter received a 1994 Juno nomination for Best New Solo Artist, an award that covered all genres of music, as well as a nomination for Best Country Male Vocalist.

Witter signed a songwriting deal with Curb Records in 1999. That resulted in a record deal and the release of his second album, All My Life, in both Canada and the United States. He continued his string of hits in Canada with songs like "All My Life," "Jumpin' Right In," "Tough As A Pickup Truck," "One Beat at a Time" and "One Hundred Years." Unfortunately, none of his singles reached Billboard's Hot Country Songs chart in the U.S.

When it came time to go back into the studio, Witter was encouraged by Mike Curb to record a Christian record. The result was his third album, 2003's Forgiveness. The album received a nomination at the 2004 GMA Dove Awards for Album of the Year.

Witter is currently performing in The Piano Men, a tribute to the music of the 1970s, performing the songs of Billy Joel and Elton John.

Discography

Studio albums

Singles

Music videos

Awards and recognition 
Canadian Country Music Awards
 1994 Video of the Year: "Stolen Moments"
 1995 Vocal Collaboration Of The Year
 1996 Vocal Collaboration Of The Year

GMA Dove Awards
 2004 nominee, Inspirational Album of the Year: Forgiveness

Juno Awards
 1994 nominee, Country Male Vocalist of the Year
 1994 nominee, Best New Solo Artist
 1995 nominee, Country Male Vocalist of the Year
 2000 nominee, Best Country Male Artist
 2004 nominee, Contemporary Christian/Gospel Album of the Year: Forgiveness

References

External links 
The Piano Men Starring Jim Witter

1964 births
Living people
Canadian country singer-songwriters
Canadian male singers
Canadian performers of Christian music
Musicians from Hamilton, Ontario
Canadian male singer-songwriters